LA-1 is a constituency of Azad Kashmir Legislative Assembly which is currently represented by the Ch. Azhar Sadiq of Pakistan Tehreek-e-Insaf. It covers the area of Dadyal in Mirpur District of Azad Kashmir, Pakistan.

Election 2021

Elections were held in this constituency on 25 July 2021.

Election 2016

elections were held in this constituency on 21 July 2016.

References

Mirpur District
Azad Kashmir Legislative Assembly constituencies